Gelora Citramas Stadium is a stadium in Batam, Riau Islands, Indonesia. The stadium is home to 757 Kepri Jaya It has a seating capacity of 600 people. Pak Kris Wiluan built the Citramas Stadium to develop athletics which the mother of all sports.

The stadium, established by the Foundation Citramas Group is indeed intended as a special field of exercise and not as a commercial field. Even visitors are prohibited from smoking, because smoking is against the philosophy of health that brought sports lovers.

The stadium is located in Kabil, Nongsa has made a synthetic athletics track and the international class. This fact according to expectations Executive Board (PB) Athletics Association of Indonesia (PAS) Centre which decreed that if the achievement of a championship to be recognized, it must use a synthetic track.

Azman said, The stadium will never be used for political or commercial interests. Because it was built to promote the sport and PS Citramas also training at this stadium.

Citramas Foundation board, said that, technically Citramas Stadium has a football pitch measuring 67 x 105 meters. Around it is equipped with 8-lane running track made from synthetic athletic standards of the International Association of Athletics Federations (IAAF).

See also
 List of stadiums in Indonesia
 List of stadiums by capacity

References

Football venues in Indonesia
Sports venues in Indonesia
Buildings and structures in Central Sulawesi
Post-independence architecture of Indonesia
Sport in Riau Islands